School District 74 may refer to:
Lincolnwood School District 74 - Lincolnwood, Illinois, United States (Chicago area)
School District 74 Gold Trail - British Columbia, Canada